José Aurélio Drummond Jr. (born c. 1964) is a Brazilian businessman. He is the global chief executive officer (CEO) of BRF S.A.

Early life
Drummond was born circa 1964. He graduated from the Centro Universitário da FEI, and attended the executive development program at the Wharton School of the University of Pennsylvania.

Career
Drummond worked at Eneva, Alcoa and Whirlpool. On November 22, 2017, he succeeded Pedro de Andrade Faria as the global CEO of BRF S.A.

References

Living people
1960s births
Brazilian chief executives